Red and Black (Italian:Rosso e nero) is a 1955 Italian film directed by Domenico Paolella and starring Renato Rascel, Walter Chiari and Rosy Mazzacurati.

Cast
 Renato Rascel 
 Walter Chiari 
 Rosy Mazzacurati 
 Carlo Croccolo 
 Alba Arnova 
 Riccardo Billi 
 Carlo Ninchi 
 Paola Borboni 
 Arnoldo Foà 
 Andrea Checchi 
 Fulvia Mammi
 Maria Bianconi  
 Mimmo Craig 
 Diana Dei 
 Patrizia Della Rovere 
 Arturo Dominici 
 Bianca Maria Fabbri 
 Franca Gandolfi 
 Fanny Landini 
 Patrizia Lari 
 Sonia Moser 
 Franca Rame 
 Lilli Scaringi 
 Goffredo Spinedi 
 Enrico Urbini

References

Bibliography
 Susanna Buffa. Un musicista per il cinema: Carlo Rustichelli, un profilo artistico. Carocci, 2004.

External links

1955 films
1950s Italian-language films
Films directed by Domenico Paolella
Italian comedy films
1955 comedy films
Italian black-and-white films
1950s Italian films